I Order You, based on same novel series by Fla-da, is a 2015 South Korean drama series starring Jung Yun-ho and Kim Ga-eun.

Plot
Yeo Gook-dae (Jung Yun-ho) is a talented chef who had a bad experience in a relationship in the past. He was heartbroken since his bride had left him on the day of their marriage. Then, he meets Park Song-ah (Kim Ga-eun) and they fall in love with each other. But eventually their meeting makes them deal with the secrets of the past.

Cast

Main cast

Jung Yun-ho as Yeo Gook-dae
Kim Ga-eun as Park Song-ah

Supporting Cast
Jang Seung-jo as Kevin
Goo Jae-yee as Ah Da-hwa
Baek Jong-won as Han Bi-ryong
Cho Yoon-woo as Nam Soo-ri
Yoon Hong-bin as Park Song-joo
Jung Yi-rang as Oh Duk-hee
Noh Young-kook as President Director of Inde Communication
Park Joon-geum as Gook-dae's mother
Choi Ji-yun as Song-ah's mother

References 

2015 South Korean television series debuts
Korean-language television shows
2015 South Korean television series endings
Seoul Broadcasting System television dramas
Naver TV original programming
2015 web series debuts
South Korean drama web series
2015 web series endings
Television shows based on South Korean novels